The 4th constituency of the Haute-Savoie (French: Quatrième circonscription de la Haute-Savoie) is a French legislative constituency in the Haute-Savoie département. Like the other 576 French constituencies, it elects one MP using a two round electoral system.

Description

The 4th constituency of Haute-Savoie covers a swathe of the western border of the department, including the town of Annemasse close to the Swiss border.

The seat has a strong tendency towards the centre right and in 2017 was one of only two constituencies in Haute-Savoie that returned an LR deputy. In 2012 Virginie Duby-Muller succeeded fellow Union for a Popular Movement member Claude Birraux who had served as the area's representative since 1988.

Assembly Members

Election results

2022

 
 
 
|-
| colspan="8" bgcolor="#E9E9E9"|
|-

2017

 
 
 
 
 
 
|-
| colspan="8" bgcolor="#E9E9E9"|
|-

2012

 
 
 
 
 
 
 
|-
| colspan="8" bgcolor="#E9E9E9"|
|-

References

4